The Sony Xperia PRO-I is an Android smartphone manufactured by Sony. Designed to be the new professional flagship of Sony's Xperia series, the phone was announced on October 26, 2021.

Specifications

Hardware 
The Xperia PRO-I has a Qualcomm Snapdragon 888 SoC and an Adreno 660 GPU, with 12 GB of RAM and 512 GB of UFS internal storage (which can be expanded up to 1 TB via the microSD card slot) as well as a dual-hybrid nano-SIM card slot. The phone features a 6.5-inch 4K OLED with an ultrawide 21:9 aspect ratio, and has 10-bit color, support for HDR BT.2020, and a 120Hz refresh rate. It has a 4500mAh battery, and supports 30W fast charging over USB-C, but lacks support for wireless charging. The phone has front-facing dual stereo speakers and a 3.5mm audio jack.

Camera 
The Xperia PRO-I has three rear-facing 12MP sensors and a 3D iToF sensor, and a front-facing 8MP sensor. The rear cameras include the wide lens (24mm), the ultra wide lens (16mm f/2.2) and the telephoto lens (50mm f/2.4); all of which use ZEISS' T✻ (T-Star) anti-reflective coating. The wide lens uses a modified version of the 20MP 1.0-type stacked sensor found in the RX100 VII, however only 60% of the sensor is used to output 12MP photos. The lens has a mechanical dual aperture (f/2.0 and f/4.0) allowing users to control the depth of field. The cameras are capable of recording 4K video at up to 120 FPS and 1080p video at up to 240 FPS. The phone also has 12-bit RAW output.

Software 
The Xperia PRO-I runs on Android 11. It is also equipped with a "Photo Pro" mode developed by Sony's camera division α (Alpha) and a "Cinema Pro" mode developed by Sony's cinematography division CineAlta, as well as a new "Video Pro" mode.

References

Android (operating system) devices
Sony smartphones
Mobile phones introduced in 2021
Mobile phones with multiple rear cameras
Mobile phones with 4K video recording